National Highway 748 (NH 748) is a National Highway in India that starts from Belgaum in Karnataka and ends at Panaji in North Goa district. It is a spur road of National Highway 48.

Route
NH48 near Belgaum, Anmod, Ponda, NH66 near Panaji.

Junctions  
 
  Terminal near Belgaum.
  near Machhe.
  near Ramnagar.
  near Ponda.
  Terminal near Bijapur.

See also
 List of National Highways in India
 List of National Highways in India by state
 National Highways Development Project

References

External links
 NH 748 on OpenStreetMap

National highways in India
National Highways in Karnataka
National Highways in Goa
Transport in Belgaum
Transport in Panaji